Pterodoras is a small genus of thorny catfishes native to tropical South America.

Species
There are currently two recognized species in this genus:
 Pterodoras granulosus (Valenciennes, 1821) (Granulated catfish)
 Pterodoras rivasi (Fernández-Yépez, 1950)

References

Doradidae
Fish of South America
Fish of the Amazon basin
Catfish genera
Taxa named by Pieter Bleeker
Freshwater fish genera